Ralph Metcalf may refer to:
 Ralph Metcalf (New Hampshire politician) (1796–1858), American lawyer and politician from New Hampshire
 Ralph Metcalf (Washington politician) (1861–1939), American politician in the state of Washington
 Ralph Metcalf (North Dakota politician), member of the North Dakota House of Representatives

See also
 Ralph Metcalfe (1910–1978), American Olympic sprinter and U.S. Representative from Illinois